Robert the Magnificent (22 June 1000 – 1–3 July 1035) was the duke of Normandy from 1027 until his death in 1035.

Owing to uncertainty over the numbering of the dukes of Normandy he is usually called Robert I, but sometimes Robert II with his ancestor Rollo as Robert I. He was the son of Richard II and brother of Richard III, who preceded him as the duke. Less than a year after his father's death, Robert revolted against his brother's rule, but failed. He would later inherit Normandy after his brother's death. He was succeeded by his illegitimate son, William the Conqueror, who became the first Norman king of England in 1066, following the Norman conquest of England.

Biography 

Robert was the son of Richard II of Normandy and Judith, daughter of Conan I, Duke of Brittany. He was also grandson of Richard I of Normandy, great-grandson of William I of Normandy and great-great grandson of Rollo, the Viking who founded Normandy. Before he died, Richard II had decided his elder son Richard III would succeed him while his second son Robert would become Count of Hiémois. In August 1026, their father Richard II died and Richard III became duke, but soon afterwards Robert rebelled against him, and was subsequently defeated and forced to swear fealty to Richard.

Early reign 

When Richard III died a year later, there were suspicions that Robert had something to do with his death. Although nothing could be proven, Robert had the most to gain. The civil war Robert I had brought against his brother Richard III was still causing instability in the duchy. Private wars raged between neighbouring barons, which resulted in a new aristocracy arising in Normandy during Robert's reign. 

It was also during this time that many of the lesser nobility left Normandy to seek their fortunes in southern Italy and elsewhere. Soon after assuming the duchy, possibly in revenge for supporting his brother against him, Robert I assembled an army against his uncle, Robert, Archbishop of Rouen and Count of Évreux. A temporary truce allowed his uncle to leave Normandy in exile but this resulted in an edict excommunicating all of Normandy, which was only lifted when Archbishop Robert was allowed to return and his countship was restored. 

Robert also attacked another powerful churchman, his cousin Hugo III d'Ivry, Bishop of Bayeux, banishing him from Normandy for an extended period of time. Robert also seized a number of church properties belonging to the Abbey of Fecamp.

Outside of Normandy 

Despite his domestic troubles, Robert decided to intervene in the civil war in Flanders between Baldwin V, Count of Flanders and his father Baldwin IV, whom the younger Baldwin had driven out of Flanders. Baldwin V, supported by king Robert II of France, his father-in-law, was persuaded to make peace with his father in 1030 when Duke Robert promised the elder Baldwin his considerable military support. Robert gave shelter to Henry I of France against his mother, Queen Constance, who favoured her younger son Robert to succeed to the French throne after his father Robert II. For his help Henry I rewarded Robert with the French Vexin. 

In the early 1030s, Alan III, Duke of Brittany began expanding his influence from the area of Rennes and appeared to have designs on the area surrounding Mont Saint-Michel. After sacking Dol and repelling Alan's attempts to raid Avranches, Robert mounted a major campaign against his cousin Alan III. However, Alan appealed to their uncle, Archbishop Robert of Rouen, who then brokered a peace between Duke Robert and his vassal Alan III. His cousins, the Athelings Edward and Alfred, sons of his aunt Emma of Normandy and Athelred, King of England, had been living at the Norman Court and at one point Robert, on their behalf, attempted to mount an invasion of England but was prevented in doing so, it was said, by unfavourable winds, that scattered and sank much of the fleet. Robert made a safe landing in Guernsey. Gesta Normannorum Ducum stated that King Cnut sent envoys to Duke Robert offering to settle half the Kingdom of England on Edward and Alfred. After postponing the naval invasion, he chose to also postpone the decision until after he returned from Jerusalem.

Church and pilgrimage 
Robert's attitude towards the Church had changed noticeably certainly since reinstating his uncle's position as Archbishop of Rouen. In his attempt to reconcile his differences with the Church, he restored property that he or his vassals had confiscated, and by 1034 had returned all the properties he had earlier taken from the abbey of Fecamp.

After making his illegitimate son William his heir, he set out on pilgrimage to Jerusalem. According to the Gesta Normannorum Ducum he travelled by way of Constantinople, reached Jerusalem, fell seriously ill and died on the return journey at Nicaea on 2 July 1035. His son William, aged about eight, succeeded him.

According to the historian William of Malmesbury, decades later his son William sent a mission to Constantinople and Nicaea, charging it with bringing his father's body back to Normandy for burial. Permission was granted but, having travelled as far as Apulia (Italy) on the return journey, the envoys learned that William himself had meanwhile died. They then decided to re-inter Robert's body in Italy.

Concubines and children 
By his mistress or concubine, Herleva of Falaise, he was father of:
 William the Conqueror (c. 1028–1087).

By Herleva or possibly another concubine, he was the father of:
 Adelaide of Normandy, who married firstly, Enguerrand II, Count of Ponthieu. She married secondly, Lambert II, Count of Lens, and thirdly, Odo II of Champagne.

Notes

References 

1000 births
1035 deaths
11th-century Dukes of Normandy
Norman warriors
Dukes of Normandy
House of Normandy